St. Joseph's RC High School is a secondary high school on the outskirts of Newport, Wales.

School history and performance
The school was a case study in research published by the Australian Council for Educational Research. The research describes progress from "considerable underachievement" in 1994 to above average performance by 2008.

In the school's 2018 Estyn inspection report it was assessed as 'good' on four of the five standards, and as 'excellent' in Care, Guidance and Support.

Extracurricular activities and clubs
Estyn noted the school's extra-curricular provision, including trips, chaplaincy meetings, a gardening club, a folk group, sports' clubs, a fairtrade club and work on recycling. There are also book clubs and a reading buddy scheme.

The school competes in the Young Enterprise competition, where pupils get to start and run their own business. In 2007 the team received a series of prizes:
Runner Up: Gwent Best Company Overall
Runner Up: Best Use of IT
First Place: Company Report
Runner Up: Best Trade Stand
In 2008 it bettered these results winning:- 
1st Prize in every category at the Newport and Monmouthshire Young Enterprise 2008 final
In the Gwent Final they won;
Best Company Report
Best Trade Stand
Runner-up Best Company
Best presentation

Notable alumni
Rollin Menayese, footballer
Harry Powell, cricketer

References

Catholic secondary schools in the Archdiocese of Cardiff
Secondary schools in Newport, Wales